Aethes ignobilis is a species of moth of the family Tortricidae. It was described by Razowski in  1994. It is found in Durango, Mexico.

References

ignobilis
Moths described in 1994
Moths of Central America
Taxa named by Józef Razowski